Shangri-La Entertainment, LLC is an American film production company established in 2000 by Steve Bing and Adam Rifkin, currently headquartered in Los Angeles, California.

It is owned by the Shangri-La Business Group, an organization with interests in property, construction, entertainment, and music.

Films 
 Without Charlie (2001)
 Night at the Golden Eagle (2001)
 The Big Bounce (2004)
 The Polar Express (2004)
 Sierra Leone's Refugee All Stars (2005)
 Looking for Comedy in the Muslim World (2005)
 Neil Young: Heart of Gold (2006)
 For Your Consideration (2006)
 Pete Seeger: The Power of Song (2007)
 Beowulf (2007)
 CSNY/Déjà Vu (2008)
 Shine a Light (2008)
 Youth in Revolt (2009)
 Girl Walks into a Bar (2011)
 Marley (2012)
 Hotel Noir (2012)
 Rock the Kasbah (2015)
 Rules Don't Apply (2016)
  Kingsman: The Golden Circle'' (2017, uncredited)

Notes and references

External links 
 Official website (archived)

Film production companies of the United States
Mass media companies established in 2000
Entertainment companies based in California